Mimosa hamata (Hindi:Alāy shrub (अलाय) is a species of flowering shrub in the family Fabaceae, that is native to the countries of India and Pakistan.

Uses
This plant has been used for animal feed.

References

hamata
Flora of India (region)
Flora of Pakistan
Flora of the Thar Desert